Danai Udomchoke (born 11 August 1981) is a former professional tennis player from Thailand. He was born in Bangkok, where he still resides.

Udomchoke turned professional in 1997, and was coached by Jan Stoce. He is sponsored by Dunlop Sport for his racquets and apparel. His career-best ranking was World No. 77 on 29 January 2007.

Grand Slams

Udomchoke made his debut in the main draw of a Grand Slam in 2004 when he qualified for the US Open. He lost to Spaniard Tommy Robredo in straight sets. One of Udomchoke's highest profile matches was his 2006 Australian Open 1st round match against No. 3 seed David Nalbandian. After starting out slowly, Udomchoke shocked Nalbandian by winning the third and fourth sets. However, his energy soon wore down, and despite pushing the World No. 3 to five sets, Udomchoke lost 2–6, 2–6, 6–1, 7–6, 1–6. In the 2007 Australian Open, Udomchoke advanced to the third round, losing to 14th-seeded Novak Djokovic after defeating 24th-seeded Juan Carlos Ferrero. Udomchoke qualified for Wimbledon in 2007 and was defeated in the second round by Andy Roddick.

ATP career finals

Doubles: 1 (1–0)

Asian Games

In the 15th Asian Games held in Doha, Qatar, he won the gold medal for Thailand, after beating Korean Lee Hyung-taik in two sets, 7–5 and 6–3, in the men's singles tournament.

Singles titles (9)

Singles performance timeline

''Current until 2014 Australian Open.

External links 
 
 
 
 
 
 
 

1981 births
Living people
Danai Udomchoke
Danai Udomchoke
Asian Games medalists in tennis
Tennis players at the 1998 Asian Games
Tennis players at the 2002 Asian Games
Tennis players at the 2006 Asian Games
Tennis players at the 2010 Asian Games
Tennis players at the 2014 Asian Games
Danai Udomchoke
Danai Udomchoke
Medalists at the 2006 Asian Games
Universiade medalists in tennis
Danai Udomchoke
Danai Udomchoke
Danai Udomchoke
Southeast Asian Games medalists in tennis
Competitors at the 2005 Southeast Asian Games
Competitors at the 2007 Southeast Asian Games
Competitors at the 2009 Southeast Asian Games
Competitors at the 2011 Southeast Asian Games
Competitors at the 2015 Southeast Asian Games
Danai Udomchoke
Medalists at the 2007 Summer Universiade